István Kozel was the author of the Catholic hymnal Prva krašička pesmarica written in the Prekmurje dialect in the 18th century. Kozel lived in Krašči in the Slovene March (Prekmurje) in the Kingdom of Hungary. The hymnal probably originally contained 350 pages, but only 328 pages remain.

Literature 
 Vilko Novak: Martjanska pesmarica, Založba ZRC. Ljubljana 1997.

See also 
 List of Slovene writers and poets in Hungary

Slovenian writers and poets in Hungary
18th-century deaths
Year of birth unknown
People from the Municipality of Cankova